A buyout is an investment transaction.

Buyout may also refer to:

Drama 
 Buyout (Breaking Bad)

Finance 
 Buyout firm
 Buyout fund
 Employee buyout
 Leveraged buyout
 Management buyout

Sports 
 Buyout clause